Ella Shelton (born January 19, 1998) is a Canadian ice hockey player and member of the Canadian national ice hockey team, currently affiliated with the Toronto chapter of the Professional Women's Hockey Players Association (PWHPA). Having competed at the NCAA level with the Clarkson Golden Knights women's ice hockey program, she served as team captain in her senior year. She was one of 28 players invited to Hockey Canada's Centralization Camp, which represents the selection process for the Canadian women's team that shall compete in Ice hockey at the 2022 Winter Olympics.

Playing career
Shelton competed in the Provincial Women's Hockey League (PWHL) with the London Jr. Devilettes club. In 2016, Shelton skated for Team Ontario's U18 provincial squad.

Clarkson
During her junior season, Shelton led the Golden Knights in shots blocked with 81. Additionally, she was named the assistant captain. She would follow it up with the honour of team captain in her senior season, one which saw her named as a finalist for the ECAC's Best Defenseman award.

International
Shelton was named to the Canadian contingent that participated at the Nation's Cup in Fussen, Germany, in January 2018, which saw her call fellow Clarkson Golden Knights Loren Gabel a teammate. Losing both games in the preliminary round, Canada defeated Germany by a 5-1 mark in the fifth-place game; Shelton would assist on a second period goal by Brooke Stacey.

On January 11, 2022, Shelton was named to Canada's 2022 Olympic team.

Awards and honours

ECAC
ECAC Hockey Rookie of the Month for December 2016
2016-17 ECAC Hockey All-Academic team
2016-17 ECAC Hockey Third-Team All-League 
2016-17 ECAC Hockey All-Rookie Team
2017 ECAC Hockey Championship All-Tournament Team
2018 ECAC Hockey Championship All-Tournament Team
2017-18 ECAC Hockey All-Academic team
2018-19 Second-Team ECAC Hockey All-Star
2018-19 ECAC Hockey All-Academic team
2019 ECAC Championship All-Tournament team

NCAA
2016-17 USCHO.com All-Rookie Team
2018-19 Second Team AHCA All-American
2019-20 Second Team All-USCHO.com
2019-20 ECAC Hockey First Team All-Conference
2019-20 Second Team AHCA All-American

References

External links 
 

1998 births
Living people
Canadian women's ice hockey players
Ice hockey players at the 2022 Winter Olympics
Olympic ice hockey players of Canada
Medalists at the 2022 Winter Olympics
Olympic gold medalists for Canada
Olympic medalists in ice hockey